Kirat Singh is an Indian politician. He was elected to the Uttar Pradesh Legislative Assembly from Gangoh in the 2019 by election and 2022 Uttar Pradesh Legislative Assembly election as a member of the Bharatiya Janata Party.

References

Living people
Uttar Pradesh MLAs 2022–2027
Bharatiya Janata Party politicians from Uttar Pradesh
People from Saharanpur district
Uttar Pradesh MLAs 2017–2022
Year of birth missing (living people)